Columbia Township is one of twelve townships in Dubois County, Indiana. As of the 2010 census, its population was 1,065 and it contained 467 housing units.

Geography

Unincorporated towns
 Crystal
 Cuzco
 Hillham
 Norton
(This list is based on USGS data and may include former settlements.)

Adjacent townships
 Lost River Township, Martin County (north)
 French Lick Township, Orange County (northeast)
 Jackson Township, Orange County (east)
 Hall Township (south)
 Marion Township (southwest)
 Harbison Township (west)

Major highways
  Indiana State Road 56

Cemeteries
The township contains three cemeteries: Burton, Robinson and Wininger.

References
 
 United States Census Bureau cartographic boundary files

External links
 Indiana Township Association
 United Township Association of Indiana

Townships in Dubois County, Indiana
Jasper, Indiana micropolitan area
Townships in Indiana